Bernard Solomon Kotzin (November 11, 1918 – December 14, 1997), known as Stubby Kaye, was an American actor, comedian, vaudevillian, and singer, known for his appearances on Broadway and in film musicals.

Kaye originated the roles of Nicely-Nicely Johnson in Guys and Dolls and Marryin' Sam in Li'l Abner, introducing two show-stopping numbers of the era: "Sit Down, You're Rockin' the Boat" and "Jubilation T. Cornpone." He reprised these roles in the movie versions of the two shows. Other well-known roles include Herman in Bob Fosse's Sweet Charity, Sam the Shade in Cat Ballou, and Marvin Acme in Who Framed Roger Rabbit.

Biography
Kaye was born Bernard Solomon (or Sholom) Kotzin on the last day of the First World War, at West 114th Street in the Morningside Heights section of Manhattan. His parents were first generation Jewish-Americans originally from Russia and Austria-Hungary. His father, David Kotzin, was a dress salesman, and the former Harriet "Hattie" Freundlish was his mother. He was raised in the Far Rockaway section of Queens and later in The Bronx, where he acted in student productions at DeWitt Clinton High School, and where he graduated in 1937.

In 1939, he won the Major Bowes Amateur Hour contest on radio where the prize included touring in vaudeville, where he was sometimes billed as an "Extra Padded Attraction." During the Second World War, he joined the USO where he toured battle fronts and made his London debut performing with Bob Hope. After the war, he continued to work in vaudeville and as master of ceremonies for the swing orchestras of Freddy Martin and Charlie Barnet.

Directors viewed Kaye as a master of the Broadway idiom, evidenced by his introduction of three show-stopping numbers of the era:  "Fugue for Tinhorns" and "Sit Down, You're Rockin' the Boat"  from Guys and Dolls (1950) and  "Jubilation T. Cornpone" from Li'l Abner (1956). In 1953 he played in You Can't Run Away from It, a remake of It Happened One Night. Kaye is best remembered for creating the role of Nicely-Nicely Johnson in Guys and Dolls, first on Broadway and then in the film version. He also played Marryin' Sam in Li'l Abner, again on both stage and screen. He played  the title character in Michael Winner's film The Cool Mikado (1962).

In the mid-1950s, Kaye guest starred on NBC's early sitcom The Martha Raye Show. In 1958, he appeared on the short-lived NBC variety show The Gisele MacKenzie Show. About this time, he also appeared on ABC's The Pat Boone Chevy Showroom. In the 1959–60 television season, Kaye co-starred in the short-lived NBC sitcom Love and Marriage.

In the 1960-61 television season, Kaye appeared as Marty, the agent of aspiring actress Eileen Sherwood, in the CBS sitcom My Sister Eileen, starring Shirley Bonne, Elaine Stritch, Jack Weston, Raymond Bailey, and Rose Marie.

In the 1960s, Kaye became known as the host of a weekly children's talent show, Stubby's Silver Star Show. During the 1962–63 television season, he was a regular on Stump the Stars. On April 14, 1963, he guest-starred as "Tubby Mason" in NBC's Ensign O'Toole, a comedy series, starring Dean Jones.

From 1964 to 1965, he hosted the Saturday morning children's game show Shenanigans on ABC.

Kaye appeared alongside Nat King Cole as a travelling musician in the western/comedy Cat Ballou (1965), starring Jane Fonda and Lee Marvin. He played Herman in the Universal musical film Sweet Charity (1969), directed by Bob Fosse and starring Shirley MacLaine in the title role. In that movie, he sang the song "I Love to Cry at Weddings."

Kaye's later stage productions included the 1974 Broadway revival of Good News, Man of Magic in London (with Stuart Damon as Harry Houdini), and his final Broadway show Grind, co-starring Ben Vereen, in 1985. He made a guest appearance in the British series Doctor Who, in the serial "Delta and the Bannermen" (1987). His last featured film role was as Marvin Acme in Robert Zemeckis's film Who Framed Roger Rabbit (1988).

Personal life
His first wife was Jeanne Watson from Chicago, who was a clerical worker at the movie studios in the late 1950s. They were married in 1960 as the series Love and Marriage ended, but the couple divorced because of personal differences within a year of their marriage.

Kaye's second wife, Angela Bracewell, was a former dancer at the London Palladium whom he met while living in Britain. She was the hostess of the British version of the Beat the Clock game show, a segment of Val Parnell's Sunday Night at the London Palladium. They remained married until his death. He was a second cousin of comedian Bill Maher.

Kaye died on December 14, 1997, of lung cancer at the age of 79.

Partial filmography
Taxi (1953) - Morris (uncredited)
Guys and Dolls (1955) - Nicely-Nicely Johnson
The Revolt of Mamie Stover (1956) - Howard Sloan (scenes deleted)
You Can't Run Away from It (1956) - Fred Toten
Li'l Abner (1959) - Marryin' Sam
40 Pounds of Trouble (1962) - Cranston
The Cool Mikado (1963) - Judge Herbert Mikado / Charlie Hotfleisch
Sex and the Single Girl (1964) - Helen's Cabbie
Cat Ballou (1965) - Shouter / Sam the Shade
The Way West (1967) - Sam Fairman
Sweet Charity (1969) - Herman
Can Heironymus Merkin Ever Forget Mercy Humppe and Find True Happiness? (1969) - Fat Writer
The Monitors (1969) - Man in Monitors Commercial
The Cockeyed Cowboys of Calico County (1970) - Bartender
Cool It Carol! (1970) - Rod Strangeways
Six Pack Annie (1975) - Mr. Bates
Timber Tramps (1975)
Goldie and the Boxer Go to Hollywood (1981, TV movie) - Babe
Ellis Island (1984) (TV Miniseries) - Abe Shulman
Doctor Who (Delta and the Bannermen, 1987) - Weismuller
Who Framed Roger Rabbit (1988, final film) - Marvin Acme

References

External links

 Stubby Kaye interview on BBC Radio 4 Desert Island Discs, February 10, 1984

1918 births
1997 deaths
People from Far Rockaway, Queens
Vaudeville performers
Male actors from New York City
Deaths from lung cancer in California
American male film actors
American male musical theatre actors
American male stage actors
American people of Austrian-Jewish descent
American people of Hungarian-Jewish descent
American people of Russian-Jewish descent
20th-century American male actors
Jewish American male actors
Jewish male comedians
DeWitt Clinton High School alumni
20th-century American comedians
20th-century American male singers
20th-century American singers
20th-century American Jews